Luis Martín Bevacqua (born 12 June 1989) is an Argentine footballer who currently plays for Deportes Copiapó in the Primera B de Chile.

References
 
 

1989 births
Living people
Argentine footballers
Argentine expatriate footballers
Club Atlético Los Andes footballers
Club Deportivo Palestino footballers
Curicó Unido footballers
Deportes Copiapó footballers
Primera B de Chile players
Chilean Primera División players
Expatriate footballers in Chile
Association football midfielders
Sportspeople from Lanús